Kingersheim (or ; Alsatian: Kingersche) is a commune in the Haut-Rhin department, Grand Est (formerly Alsace), northeastern France. It forms part of the Mulhouse Alsace Agglomération, the inter-communal local government body for the Mulhouse conurbation. A few centuries ago, it was still a small village but nowadays Kingersheim has become the eighth municipality of the Haut-Rhin. The town is mainly a residential district but we can also find an important commercial area which extends up to Wittenheim. Its inhabitants are called Kingersheimois and Kingersheimoises.

Geography

Located in the Alsace plain, the town of Kingersheim has almost no hills.

Since the 1970s, its population increased a lot, owing to its situation in the urban agglomeration of Mulhouse. During these last years, the urbanization got denser, especially because of the construction of new houses and the construction of a "Green District".

History 

Kingersheim first appeared in 1195, and was named Kemingsen. Its origin is from a legend, concerning a hunting lodge probably erected in the historic center. The Schoenensteinbach chronicle is about the condition of the parishes of Wittenheim and Kingersheim during the 12th and 13th centuries. This Chronicle recalls that in the year 1199, the bishop Lüthold de Bâle, commanded the Kingersheim chapel to be connected to Wittenheim parish. In 1202, Pope Innocent III confirmed the ruling letters of the two bishops and in 1216, Neuwiller abbey gave as a present to the Schoenensteinbach monastery, a relic of Saint Adelphe which was dropped off in Kingersheim chapel.

Noblemen of Hus Wittenheim were the lords of Kingersheim since the 14th century and thereafter, their successors were the Andlau nobles. Many titles or charters of investiture have been written, among which the 1351 title. It is written that Therry de Hust is invested of a quarter of Wittenheim castle as well as a quarter of Kingersheim village. Wittenheim village formerly constituted in the feudal system the body of a burg having received a charter which allowed the lords to govern more than one village, amongst others, Kingersheim village.

In 1473, Lazare d'Andlau was invested of Kingersheim village by Pierre de Hagenbach, grand bailiff of Charles le Téméraire. Lazare was married to Judith de Ramstein and they had a son named Louis (1474-1509). Knight, he was the founder of the branch of the Kingersheim Andlau.

The autonomy of the town appeared in the end of the 15th century. Louis d'Andlau of Kingersheim was the first Andlau to build Kingersheim castle and to live within it.

Population

Discovering the city

St Adelphe Church

St Adelphe Church belongs to the historic heritage of the city. Its 150th birthday was celebrated on 11 September 2011.

Créa

In 1913, Kingersheim wasn’t a big city, rather a small village. Six café-restaurants were listed in its phone book. These all faced the heart of Kingersheim: the town hall-school.

Nowadays, the Créa is one of the most important sites in the town, with several cultural events held each month. But first and foremost, it’s the place where all Kingersheim children spend their free time: many activities such as theatre, sport (classical dance, swimming…) drawing, painting, sewing, pottery… are offered to the inhabitants. Moreover, holiday centers are organized during the vacation. There is a library on the top floor.

Playgrounds

Many places to relax and playgrounds are offered in Kingersheim. These are well fitted out and secured. Thus, the inhabitants, especially the children and the teenagers, spend a lot of time outside, enjoying the following city planning: Bramont playground (football pitch), Béarn playground (football and basketball pitch), Vert-Village (basketball pitch), Fernand-Anna (football pitch) and more recently the new Plaine de foot et de loisirs next to the Gounod gymnasium.

Tival

This auditorium was built in 2000 in one of the last building of the textile factory. That’s why its uncluttered and raw architecture in an homage to its industrial past. However its equipment shows that it’s also a modern and practical auditorium, located in the center of the town and well adapted to the cultural programming of Kingersheim. Due to its large stage (11 meters in width), a room that can seat 290 people and receive until 670 people standing, the Tival Area can host shows, concerts, dance, meetings, and exhibitions. Particularly, it hosts the annual Momix festival, an international festival for young people.

Momix

Every year, for more than 20 years, Kingersheim City has offered and organized Momix, which is the essential rendezvous in the world of the young audience festival.
Since 1992, this festival for young and adults offers, during a week, about forty representations of drama, circus, dance, puppets and music.
In 2006, this festival was labeled "Scène conventionnée Jeune Public d'Alsace" and is now a national and international reference.
Momix is the opportunity, given to everyone, to access the world of the show and to develop the critical eye which makes the man and citizen of tomorrow.

Le Hangar

This is now the Kingersheim community center.

See also
 Communes of the Haut-Rhin département

References

Communes of Haut-Rhin